Iris sikkimensis is a plant species in the genus Iris, it is also in the subgenus Iris and in the section Pseudoregelia.  It is a rhizomatous perennial, from Sikkim (a landlocked Indian state located in the Himalayan mountains). It has pale green or light green thin leaves, slender stem (similar height to the leaves), 2 or 3 lilac or purple flowers, with a white beard with orange tips. It is thought to be a hybrid of Iris hookeriana and Iris kumaonensis.

Description
It has a slender, gnarled rhizome, which has the fibrous remains of old leaves on the top. It forms clumps of plants.

They are linear, erect, ensiform (sword shaped), and semi-deciduous.

The stem appears in April, from a tuft of 4 reduced Basal leaf leaves.

The stem has pale green, lanceolate spathes  (leaves of the flower bud). They are (scarious) membranous, in the top third of the leaf and along the edges.

The stems hold 2 or 3 terminal (top of stem) flowers, blooming between March and April.

The flowers come in shades of lilac or purple, with a darker mottling.

Like other irises, it has 2 pairs of petals, 3 large sepals (outer petals), known as the 'falls' and 3 inner, smaller petals (or tepals), known as the 'standards'. The haft (or part of the petal beside the stem) is wedge shaped and white with purple blotching, or marbling. In the centre of the petal is a white beard with orange tips.
The erect standards are oblong,  5 cm long and 2 cm wide. They are lighter in colour to the falls, pale mauve, or lilac, with a fainter mottling of a darker shade.

It has narrow, deep purple styles, with faint stripes, or pale at the edges, and are 2.5 cm long. The style branch has triangular crests. It has pale violet filaments, bi-lobed stigma and creamy white anthers.

It also has a green ovary, that is 2 cm long, mottled and striped purple.

After the iris has flowered, it does not produce a seed capsule or seeds.

Biochemistry
As most irises are diploid, having two sets of chromosomes, this can be used to identify hybrids and classification of groupings.
It has a chromosome count: 2n=22

Taxonomy
It is sometimes commonly known as 'Sikkim Iris'.

It is pronounced as (Iris) EYE-ris (sikkimensis) sik-im-EN-sis.

The Latin specific epithet sikkimensis refers to the region of Sikkim (Indian Himalayas) where the iris was found.

Mr William Rickatson Dykes had received this plant originally from Mr. Barr (a plant collector with Messrs. Barr. & Sons,) in about 1906, and was labelled Iris kamaonensis caulescens.  He then published and described the iris as Iris kumaonensis var. caulescens. 4 years later, he changed his mind after raising the plant from seed in his garden. He thought that it was a distinct species in its own right.

It was then published and described by William Rickatson Dykes in his book 'The Genus Iris' (Gen. Iris) on page134. in 1913, or 1912.

It is similar in form to both Iris hookeriana and Iris kemaonensis, but the range of both irises does not spread as far as the Himalayas. Due to the fact that Iris sikkimensis does not set seed, it has thought to be more of a hybrid species between the two.
The lack of seed production has also meant it is thought to be extinct in the wild. It is also very rare in cultivation, specimens have been lost in Indian herbaria and botanical gardens. No plants are found in the UK as well.

It was verified by United States Department of Agriculture and the Agricultural Research Service on 9 January 2003, then updated on 1 March 2007.

It is listed as an 'unresolved name' in The Plant List.

Iris sikkimensis is an accepted name by the RHS, it was also last listed in the 'RHS Plant Finder' in 2010.

Distribution and habitat
It is thought to be native to temperate Asia.

Range
It was found in Sikkim, in India, within the eastern Himalayas.

It was listed in 'Flowering Plants Of Sikkim' in 2008.

Cultivation
It is hardy, and can survive winter frosts. It can also tolerate moisture during the winter. 
But prefers to have a dry period during the summer.

A specimen of the iris can be found in 'The Arboretum and Botanical Garden' of the University of Bergen in Norway, and it can also be found in University Botanic Gardens of Ljubljana in Slovenia.

Propagation
It can only be propagated by division as it seems not to produce seeds.

Toxicity
Like many other irises, most parts of the plant are poisonous (rhizome and leaves), and if mistakenly ingested can cause stomach pains and vomiting. Also, handling the plant may cause a skin irritation or an allergic reaction.

References

Other sources
 Liberty Hyde Bailey Hortorium. 1976. Hortus third.
 Mathew, B. 1981. The Iris. 68.

External links
 Image of the iris in flower in the Himalayas
 Has illustration of the Iris from Dykes, W.R., The Genus Iris on page 134 

sikkimensis
Flora of Sikkim
Flora of East Himalaya
Garden plants of Asia
Plants described in 1912